Route 289 is a collector road in the Canadian province of Nova Scotia.

It is located in the northern and central part of the province, connecting Melmerby Beach Provincial Park in Kings Head with Route 236 near Green Oaks.

Communities
Green Oaks (approximate terminus)
Pleasant Valley
Brookfield
Middle Stewiacke
Halfway Brook
Otter Brook
Upper Stewiacke
Stewiacke Cross Roads
Springside
Sheepherders Junction
Lansdowne
New Lairg
Rocklin
Union Centre
Hazel Glen
Westville
New Glasgow
Academy
Little Harbour Road
Little Harbour

See also
List of Nova Scotia provincial highways

References

289
289
289
Transport in New Glasgow, Nova Scotia